James Key may refer to:
Jimmy Key (born 1961), American baseball player
James Key (Formula One) (born 1972), technical director and engineer in Formula One racing
James L. Key (1867–1939), mayor of Atlanta
James Key (artist), member of the Salón de la Plástica Mexicana